Ami Kothay Pabo Tare is a Bengali song whose lyrics and tune were written by Baul singer Gagan Harkara The melody of the hymn Amar Sonar Bangla, national anthem of Bangladesh, written by Rabindranath Tagore, is derived from this song.

Lyrics

See also
 Baul

References

External links
 Where will I find the Person of my heart?

Rabindranath Tagore
Bangladeshi songs
Bengali-language songs
Bengali music